King of the Pack is a 1926 American silent adventure film directed by Frank Richardson and starring Charlotte Stevens, Robert Gordon and Vera Lewis. Produced by the independent Gotham Pictures, it was designed as a vehicle for Peter the Great, one of several dog stars to appear in films during the 1920s.

Cast
 	Peter the Great	as King, a Dog
 Charlotte Stevens as Selah Blair
 Robert Gordon as 	Clint Sifton
 Vera Lewis as 'Widder' Gasper
 Mary Cornwallis as Kitty Carlyle
 Danny Hoy as 	Bud Gasper
 Frank Brownlee as Chuck Purdy
 W.H. Davis as Sam Blair
 Frank Norcross as Dr. Joe Stoddard

References

Bibliography
 Connelly, Robert B. The Silents: Silent Feature Films, 1910-36, Volume 40, Issue 2. December Press, 1998.
 Munden, Kenneth White. The American Film Institute Catalog of Motion Pictures Produced in the United States, Part 1. University of California Press, 1997.

External links
 

1926 films
1926 adventure films
American silent feature films
American adventure films
Films directed by Frank Richardson
American black-and-white films
Gotham Pictures films
1920s English-language films
1920s American films
Silent adventure films